The siege of Huy of 1595, also known as the assault of Huy, took place between 7 and 20 March 1595, at Huy, Archbishopric of Liège, Low Countries, as part of the Eighty Years' War and the Anglo-Spanish War (1585–1604). It concluded in a Spanish victory.

Capture
Despite the promises of Prince Maurice of Orange to relieve Huy, the forces of the new Governor-General of the Spanish Netherlands, Don Pedro Henríquez de Acevedo, Count of Fuentes (Spanish: Conde de Fuentes), led by Don Valentín Pardieu de la Motte, after a short siege and low resistance, captured the town and the citadel from the combined Protestant troops of Charles de Héraugière. Thirteen days later, on March 20, Héraugière, unable to keep the defense, agreed to terms of capitulation between the Protestant forces and the Spaniards.

The Spanish forces were composed of two Spanish tercios led by Don Luis de Velasco and Don Antonio de Zúñiga, two German regiments, three Walloon regiments, and some pieces of artillery. The majority of the Protestant forces were composed of Dutch troops, about 1,800 infantry and cavalry, which included a regiment of Scots commanded by General Barthold Balfour, and a contingent of Huguenots.<ref name="British Regiments">[https://books.google.com/books?id=MhRcAAAAcAAJ&q=Siege+of+Huy+1595%27%27An&pg=PA7 Historical Account of the British Regiments Employed Since the Reign of Queen Elizabeth and King James... I p. 7]</ref>

Abuses
Although Huy was declared neutral in the war during the occupation by the forces of Héraugière, the population endured great abuses by the Protestant soldiers. Several churches and many houses were looted. The Spanish forces retired on March 23, leaving the citadel of Huy in the hands of Captain Juan de Zornoza and 150 Spanish soldiers, until repair of the batteries and the return of the garrison of the Prince-Elector, Ernest of Bavaria.

The occupation of Huy by the United Provinces, and consequently the violation of the rights of neutral zones, was the failure of a plan by Philip of Nassau for control of an advantageous position from which to open a short route and aid the operations of the French troops commanded by the Duke of Bouillon in the borders of Luxembourg.

See also
 Siege of Groenlo (1595)
 Siege of Le Catelet (1595)
 Ernest of Bavaria
 Archbishopric of Liège
 List of Governors of the Spanish Netherlands

Notes

References
 Tracy, J.D. (2008). The Founding of the Dutch Republic: War, Finance, and Politics in Holland 1572–1588. Oxford University Press. 
 John Lothrop Motley. History of the Netherlands, 1595. Chapter XXXI. HardPress Publishing. 
 Giménez Martín, Juan. Tercios de Flandes. Ediciones Falcata Ibérica. First edition 1999, Madrid.  
 Darby, Graham. The Origins and Development of the Dutch Revolt. First published 2001. London. 
 Abraham Jacob Aa. Herinneringen uit het gebied der geschiedenis betrekkelijk de Nederlanden. J.C.van Kesteren, 1835. 
 Kamen, Henry. Spain, 1469-1714: A Society Of Conflict. Pearson Education Limited''. United Kingdom (2005).

External links
 Valentín de Pardieu, Barón de la Motte 
 Campaña de 1595, by Juan L. Sánchez 

Huy
Huy
Huy
Huy
1595 in the Habsburg Netherlands
Conflicts in 1595
Huy
Siege
Huy